Sir Senaipathige Theobald Philip Rodrigo, OBE (known as Sir Philip Rodrigo) was a Ceylonese businessmen and philanthropist. He was a member of the Senate of Ceylon. 

In July 1947, under the Sinhala Welenda Mandalaya Ordinance which established the country's chamber of commerce, Philip Rodrigo was named among the first members of its board of trustees. His honors include the Ceylonese title of Gate Mudaliyar, appointed Officer (Civil Division) in the Order of the British Empire in the 1952 New Year Honours and Knights Bachelor for his social services in the 1953 Coronation Honours.

He was married to Lady Marion Elizabeth Rodrigo. Their eldest daughter Daisybelle Rodrigo was married to Colonel Maurice de Mel and younger daughter Yvonne married Joseph Shelton Fernando, a civil servant who worked in the Department of Lands and Department of Housing, before appointment as Chairman, State Timber Cooperation.

References

Members of the Senate of Ceylon
Ceylonese Knights Bachelor
Ceylonese Officers of the Order of the British Empire
Gate Mudaliyars
Alumni of St. Benedict's College, Colombo